Goh Soon Huat (born 27 June 1990) is a Malaysian badminton player. He was a part of the Malaysia team that won bronze in the men's team event at the Incheon 2014 Asian Games. He switched to mixed doubles and paired up with Shevon Jemie Lai due to a lack of performance in the singles department.  His best achievement is winning the mixed doubles title at the 2018 Singapore Open with Lai, where they beat the 2016 Olympic gold medalists Tontowi Ahmad and Liliyana Natsir in the final in straight games.

Achievements

Southeast Asian Games 
Mixed doubles

BWF World Tour (2 titles, 2 runners-up) 
The BWF World Tour, which was announced on 19 March 2017 and implemented in 2018, is a series of elite badminton tournaments sanctioned by the Badminton World Federation (BWF). The BWF World Tour is divided into levels of World Tour Finals, Super 1000, Super 750, Super 500, Super 300, and the BWF Tour Super 100.

Mixed doubles

BWF Grand Prix (1 title, 3 runners-up) 
The BWF Grand Prix had two levels, the Grand Prix and Grand Prix Gold. It was a series of badminton tournaments sanctioned by the Badminton World Federation (BWF) and played between 2007 and 2017.

Men's singles

Mixed doubles

  BWF Grand Prix Gold tournament
  BWF Grand Prix tournament

BWF International Challenge/Series (1 title, 1 runner-up) 
Mixed doubles

  BWF International Challenge tournament
  BWF International Series tournament

References

External links 
 
 

1990 births
Living people
People from Malacca
Malaysian sportspeople of Chinese descent
Malaysian male badminton players
Badminton players at the 2018 Commonwealth Games
Commonwealth Games silver medallists for Malaysia
Commonwealth Games medallists in badminton
Badminton players at the 2014 Asian Games
Badminton players at the 2018 Asian Games
Asian Games bronze medalists for Malaysia
Asian Games medalists in badminton
Medalists at the 2014 Asian Games
Competitors at the 2011 Southeast Asian Games
Competitors at the 2017 Southeast Asian Games
Competitors at the 2019 Southeast Asian Games
Southeast Asian Games silver medalists for Malaysia
Southeast Asian Games medalists in badminton
Medallists at the 2018 Commonwealth Games